Legionella israelensis is a Gram-negative, oxidase-negative, catalase-positive, motile bacterium from the genus Legionella which was isolated from water from an oxidation pond in Ga'ash in Israel.

References

External links
Type strain of Legionella israelensis at BacDive -  the Bacterial Diversity Metadatabase

Legionellales
Bacteria described in 1986